History of Political Philosophy is a textbook edited by American political philosophers Leo Strauss and Joseph Cropsey. The book is intended primarily to introduce undergraduate students of political science to political philosophy. It is currently in its third edition.

Contributors and subjects
Some of the notable contributors include: Leo Strauss, Allan Bloom, Ralph Lerner, Muhsi Mahdi, James E. Holton, Joseph Cropsey, Harvey Mansfield, and Pierre Hassner.  Some of the subjects in the volume include: Plato, Aristotle, Cicero, St. Augustine of Hippo, Alfarabi, Moses Maimonides, Niccolò Machiavelli, Martin Luther, Thomas Hobbes, René Descartes, John Locke, Adam Smith, Georg Wilhelm Friedrich Hegel, Alexis de Tocqueville, Karl Marx, Friedrich Nietzsche, Martin Heidegger, and Leo Strauss.

External links
The University of Chicago Press
Official Website for History of Political Philosophy

1963 non-fiction books
American non-fiction books
Books in political philosophy
Books by Leo Strauss
English-language books
History books about philosophy
Political philosophy literature
University of Chicago Press books